Union Sportive Saint-Malo is a French association football club founded in 1901. They are based in the town of Saint-Malo and their home stadium is the Stade Marville. As of the 2017–18 season, they play in the Championnat National 2.

Current squad

References

Saint Malo
1901 establishments in France
Saint-Malo
Sport in Ille-et-Vilaine
Football clubs in Brittany